Amanita excelsa, also known as the European false blushing amanita, is a species of agaric fungus in the family Amanitaceae. It is found in Asia, Europe, and North America, where it grows in deciduous forests.

Amanita excelsa var. spissa is edible, but there is a serious risk of confusing it with the highly poisonous Amanita pantherina.

Amanita excelsa var. alba is inedible.

References

Fungi described in 1821
Fungi of Asia
Fungi of Europe
Fungi of North America
excelsa
Taxa named by Elias Magnus Fries
Inedible fungi